Filip Deket (born 1 May 1993) is a Slovak footballer who plays for Austrian club USC Wallern as a centre back or a defensive midfielder.

Club career
He made his league debut for Trnava against Ružomberok on 4 May 2013.

References

External links
Spartak Trnava profile
Corgoň Liga profile

1993 births
Living people
Sportspeople from Trnava
Slovak footballers
Slovak expatriate footballers
Association football defenders
FC Spartak Trnava players
MFK Lokomotíva Zvolen players
Slovak Super Liga players
2. Liga (Slovakia) players
4. Liga (Slovakia) players
Austrian Landesliga players
Austrian 2. Landesliga players
Slovak expatriate sportspeople in Austria
Expatriate footballers in Austria